The 1944 Boston College Eagles football team represented Boston College as an independent during the 1944 college football season. The Eagles were led by head coach Moody Sarno, who was in his second year covering for Denny Myers while Myers served in the United States Navy. Boston College played their home games at Alumni Field in Chestnut Hill, Massachusetts and Braves Field and Fenway Park in Boston. They finished with a record of 4–3.

Schedule

References

Boston College
Boston College Eagles football seasons
Boston College Eagles football
1940s in Boston